Dillard is an unincorporated community in Stokes County in the U.S. state of North Carolina.

References

Unincorporated communities in Stokes County, North Carolina
Unincorporated communities in North Carolina